Seoul, South Korea has many shopping areas and markets throughout the city, including Myeong-dong, Cheongdam-dong, Hongdae area, Dongdaemun and Namdaemun markets.

Markets and traditional

The largest market is the Dongdaemun Market, which supplies stocks to thousands of retail fashion shops around Korea. Near Dongdaemun market are several large mall complexes that specialize in fashion goods. Some of these are Migliore, Hello APM and Doota. The Dongdaemun area can be accessed by Dongdaemun station and Dongdaemun Stadium station.

There is the Namdaemun market named after the Namdaemun. Myeong-dong can be accessed by Myeong-dong station, and Namdaemun market from Hoehyeon station.

Gwangjang market is located in Jongno-gu, and is known for bindaetteok, and mayak gimbap. It is accessible by either Jongno 5-ga, or Euljiro 4-ga metro station.

Insa-dong is a narrow street known for its antique stores, traditional teahouses art galleries. Other markets include the Hwanghak-dong Flea Market, Gyeongdong Market for oriental medicine, Changanpyeong Antique Market and the fish markets Noryangjin Fisheries Wholesale Market and Garak Market.

Itaewon is another notable shopping area in the city lined with boutiques and stores especially targeted at the large foreign population in Seoul. The area contains tailors, leather and shoes stores, and antiques such as brassware and jewelry and specialist shops dealing in Korean art and calligraphy. Access to Itaewon is from Itaewon Station, Insa-dong from Anguk station, and Sinchon from Sinchon station , Hongik University station and Ewha Woman's University station (the former of which should not to be confused with Jamsilsaenae station on the opposite side of Seoul.

Hongdae area is also home to independent clothing stalls, discount and vintage shops, especially along the main thoroughfare of Eoulmadang-ro. The Hongdae Playground, also known as Hongik Children's Park, located between Wausan-ro and Wausan-ro 21-gil opposite Hongik University is home to street vendors who sell their wares in the evenings. On weekends, from March to November at 13:00 to 18:00, flea markets are held on Hongdea Playground that is in front of the main gate of Hongik University. The flea markets are called "Free Market" on Saturdays and "Hope Market" on Sundays.

Apgujeong (Apgujeong Station), Cheongdam-dong (Cheongdam station) and Gangnam (Gangnam station) areas are also well known shopping destinations. COEX mall in the area is also popular and also contains one of the largest aquariums in Asia, accessible from Samseong station.

The 760-meter-long section of main street Apgujeong-ro in Cheongdam-dong, that runs from Apgujeongrodeo station at Galleria Department Store to Cheongdam crossroad, has been dubbed the 'Cheongdam Fashion Street' or 'Cheongdamdong Street of Luxury Goods'. It is lined with stores of luxury brands, such as Cartier's first flagship store in South Korea, named Cartier Maison, MCM Haus flagship store, 10 Corso Como, Ermenegildo Zegna, Salvatore Ferragamo, Louis Vuitton, Prada, Burberry; as well as outlets for 3.1 Phillip Lim, Martin Margiela and Tory Burch and Korean designer Son Jung-wan. The area is also home to Vera Wang's first Asian flagship store 'Vera Wang Bridal Korea'.

Specialty stores

The Yongsan Electronics Market of Seoul is the largest electronics market in Asia. The market specializes in electronic goods as well as computer parts, of which South Korea is a major world producer of and it contains approximately 5,000 stores housed in 22 buildings. This area can be accessed via Yongsan Station or Sinyongsan Station. Techno Mart in Gwangjin-gu is a large mall specializing in electronic and computer goods, accessible directly from Gangbyeon station. There is also an electronic shopping centre located in Seocho-dong, Seocho-gu, accessible from exit 3 Nambu Bus Terminal station.

 Cosmetics and skincare
 Amorepacific Corporation: Etude House, Laneige, Innisfree, IOPE, Mamonde and Laneige Homme
 Ĭsa Knox
 Missha
 Skin Food
 The Face Shop
 Nature Republic
 CLIO
 TONYMOLY

See also
 List of South Korean retail companies

References

External links

 Shopping guide - Korea Tourism Organization

Culture of Seoul